Iain Fraser (born April 3, 1964 in Jedburgh, Scotland) is a former Canadian professional soccer player.

Fraser is known as one of the first players drafted by Major League Soccer upon its creation, as well as the lead plaintiff in the lawsuit Fraser v. Major League Soccer against the league. The sporadic nature of professional soccer in the 1980s and 1990s in North America forced Fraser to become something of a journeyman, playing in numerous indoor and outdoor leagues.

Club career

Early years
Although born in Jedburgh, Scotland, he grew up in Burlington, Ontario. Fraser attended Hartwick College in New York on a soccer scholarship. Graduating in 1986, Fraser played on three Division I NCAA tournament teams at Hartwick, playing in the Final Four in both 1984 and 1985.  He was inducted into the Hartwick College Athletic Hall of Fame in 1997.

Indoor soccer
After graduating, Fraser was drafted in the second round by the Kansas City Comets of the original Major Indoor Soccer League. He would play for the indoor club for five years before joining the Baltimore Blast for the 1991/92 season.  After the MISL folded, Fraser joined the Kansas City Attack of the indoor National Professional Soccer League in 1994. He stayed with Kansas City for three years despite interest from the rival Continental Indoor Soccer League.

Outdoor soccer
Due to the founding of the Canadian Soccer League in 1987, Fraser played indoor and outdoor soccer simultaneously, notably for Montreal Supra. This was common for many Canadian soccer players. In 1993 Fraser returned to outdoor soccer for two seasons with the Colorado Foxes of the American Professional Soccer League.

Major League Soccer
Fraser was the fifth player selected overall in the inaugural Major League Soccer draft.  Fraser spent only one season in the MLS, playing for the New England Revolution in 1996. Although he missed the first few games due to injury, once he hit the field Fraser played every minute of every game after that.  That year, the New England Revolution also featured midfielder Geoff Aunger and Mark Watson, both his teammates from the Canadian national team.

Fraser is also known for his involvement in a 1997 antitrust lawsuit brought against Major League Soccer. The case alleged that the league's single entity structure, whereby all players are contracted to the league (and not to individual teams) was in fact an illegal monopoly. He was the first plaintiff listed in the lawsuit, leading the case to be known as Fraser vs Major League Soccer.

Sacramento Knights and retirement
He then joined the Sacramento Knights of the World Indoor Soccer League, where he was employed simultaneously as a player, Head Coach, and Director of Operations. Fraser is one of the few professionals to win honours both on-field and off-field in the same seasons, as he was both named defender of the year and coach of the year in 1999 and 2001.  He stayed with the Knights until the WISL folded.

Fraser continues to be a top youth soccer coach for San Juan Soccer Club which is based in Sacramento, California.

International career
He made his debut for Canada in a June 1994 friendly match against Morocco. He earned a total of 30 caps, scoring no goals. He has represented Canada in 10 FIFA World Cup qualification matches.

His final international was a November 1997 World Cup qualification match against Costa Rica, a game after which Randy Samuel, Alex Bunbury, Paul Dolan, Frank Yallop and Colin Miller also said farewell to the national team.

Personal life
He is married to Dineen, has three children (Isabella, Dylan and Brandon) and makes his home in California, holding dual Canadian and American citizenship.

References

External links
 Player profile - CanadaSoccer
 
 MISL stats

1964 births
Living people
People from Jedburgh
Soccer people from Ontario
Sportspeople from Burlington, Ontario
American Professional Soccer League players
Association football defenders
Baltimore Blast (1980–1992) players
Colorado Foxes players
Canadian soccer players
Canada men's international soccer players
1996 CONCACAF Gold Cup players
Canadian expatriate soccer players
Canadian expatriate sportspeople in the United States
Canadian emigrants to the United States
Canadian Soccer League (1987–1992) players
Expatriate soccer players in the United States
Hamilton Steelers (1981–1992) players
Hartwick Hawks men's soccer players
Kansas City Attack (NPSL) players
Kansas City Comets (original MISL) players
Major League Soccer players
Major Indoor Soccer League (1978–1992) players
Major Indoor Soccer League (2001–2008) players
Montreal Supra players
National Professional Soccer League (1984–2001) players
Naturalized citizens of Canada
New England Revolution players
Sacramento Knights players
Scottish emigrants to Canada
Sportspeople from the Scottish Borders
Toronto Blizzard (1986–1993) players
World Indoor Soccer League players